Presidential elections were held in Lithuania in December 1997 and January 1998. In the first round on 21 December, the independent candidate Artūras Paulauskas led the former U.S. civil servant Valdas Adamkus but neither received a majority of the vote, resulting in a run-off being held on 4 January 1998, in which Adamkus defeated Paulauskas.

Campaign
The main contenders were Valdas Adamkus, who was Stasys Lozoraitis' campaign manager in the 1993 presidential election, Artūras Paulauskas, an advocate and former Deputy General Prosecutor, and Vytautas Landsbergis, Speaker of the Seimas.

In 1997 President Algirdas Mykolas Brazauskas announced that he would not seek re-election and endorsed Paulauskas.

Paulauskas was supported by the Liberal Union of Lithuania and Democratic Labour Party of Lithuania, while Adamkus was supported by the Lithuanian Centre Union.

Results
In the first round, Artūras Paulauskas won in nearly all every municipalities (except for Kaunas, Kaunas and Klaipėda districts' municipalities). Valdas Adamkus won in latter districts' municipalities. Although Vytautas Landsbergis hadn't won in any municipality, he won 41.9 per cent of the votes cast in foreign representations.

After the first round of elections, Vytautas Landsbergis endorsed Valdas Adamkus.

In the second round, votes for Artūras Paulauskas and Valdas Adamkus were cast almost equally. Valdas Adamkus won in all districts' municipalities in the Klaipėda County and along Neman River up until Alytus. Adamkus also received the most votes in Šiauliai, Panevėžys, Panevėžys, Jonava and Utena districts' municipalities. Artūras Paulauskas won in the remaining districts' municipalities, including Alytus and Vilnius.

Aftermath
In April, 1998, Artūras Paulauskas and his campaign team formed a new party, New Union (Social Liberals), which became the most supported single party in 2000 parliamentary election.

References

External links
 1997–98 Lithuanian presidential elections VRK 

Lithuania
Presidential election
Lithuania
President
Presidential elections in Lithuania